Ebilun (Manchu:, Mölendroff: ebilun; ; died 1673) was a Manchu noble and warrior of the Niohuru clan, most famous for being one of the Four Regents assisting the young Kangxi Emperor from 1661 to 1667, during the early Qing dynasty (1644–1912). A largely passive figure during the regency, Ebilun was disgraced following the ouster of the far more powerful regent Oboi and considered a political supporter of the latter. He was stripped of his positions by the emperor but later regained his noble rank. Many of his descendants became influential figures in the Qing imperial government.

Biography
Ebilun was from the Niohuru clan, which lived north of the Korean border and belonged to the Bordered Yellow Banner. He was the youngest of the sixteen sons of Eidu (1562–1621), who had been a close associate of Manchu patriarch Nurhaci. Ebilun's mother was herself a sister (or according to some sources, a cousin) of Nurhaci.

In 1634, the second Qing emperor Hong Taiji (r. 1626–1643) gave Eidu a posthumous rank of viscount, which Ebilun immediately inherited but lost in 1637 after he tried to interfere in a trial involving his niece. In 1643 Ebilun followed Nurhaci's seventh son Abatai in forays inside North China and was credited with the capture of several towns. In 1645 and 1646, after the Qing had defeated the Ming dynasty and made Beijing their capital, Ebilun served under Lekedehun in campaigns to dislodge Ming loyalist He Tengjiao (何騰蛟; 1592–1649) from Hubei and was rewarded with a minor hereditary rank. Yet his position was not assured. Because he belonged to the Yellow Banners, Ebilun was treated with suspicion by Dorgon (the Prince Regent of the young Shunzhi Emperor), whose power base was in the White Banners.

In 1648, during the persecution of Hooge, Dorgon's main rival, Ebilun's nephew accused Ebilun of having opposed Dorgon during the 1643 succession. Ebilun was sentenced to death, but his penalty was commuted. Half of his property was nonetheless confiscated and his minor nobility title was revoked.

The Shunzhi emperor restored Ebilun's titles after Dorgon's death, and eventually entrusted Ebilun with three others to assist the rule of his son (the Kangxi Emperor), who ascended the throne in 1661 at the age of seven.  Of the four regents, Ebilun was ranked third, after Sonin and Suksaha, and before Oboi. In practice Ebilun acquiesced to Oboi on nearly all decisions, as the latter gained increasing power. Ebilun also played a role in the ouster of Suksaha, which, after the infirm Sonin died, left Oboi the unchallenged top political figure at court. In 1667, after the Kangxi Emperor assumed personal rule, Ebilun was given the title of a first-class duke. In 1669, Manchu noble Giyesu memorialized the Kangxi Emperor listing 21 crimes supposedly committed by Ebilun shortly after the emperor had moved against Oboi. Ebilun was then sentenced to death. The sentence was later commuted, and Ebilun retained his title, which could be inherited by his descendants.

Family and descendants
Ebilun belonged to the Eidu line of Niohuru clan nobles, many of whom would go on to serve with distinction in the imperial service. He had five sons. The eldest, Faka, inherited Ebilun's title of duke in 1667, only to lose it several years later. 

Ebilun's sixth son, Yende, served as an official under the Yongzheng Emperor (r. 1722–1735), and in turn Yende's own son, Tsereng, served as Viceroy of Huguang; Yende's second son, Necin, served on the Grand Council of the Qianlong Emperor (r. 1735–1796). One of Ebilun's daughters became a consort of the Kangxi Emperor.

Ebilun's seventh son, Alingga, was a main figure in the succession battle among the sons of the Kangxi Emperor.

Parents
Father: Eidu (額亦都; 1562 –1621) close associate of Nurhaci
Mother: Princess of the Second Rank (和碩公主; 1595 – June/July 1659), personal name Mukushen (穆庫什), Nurhaci's fourth daughter

Consort and Issue:

Wife, of the Aisin Gioro clan (嫡妻 愛新覺羅氏)
Second Wife, of the Aisin Gioro clan   (继妻 愛新覺羅氏)
Third Wife, of the Bayara clan (三继妻 巴雅拉氏)
State duchess of the Fourth Rank , fourth daughter (d.1725)
Married a Yunsheng, Duke of the Fourth Rank (辅国公云升) of Aisin Gioro clan ,  son of Gose, Duke Quehou of the First Rank (鎮國愨厚公 高塞)
Alingga (阿靈阿;1670–1716), First Class Duke (一等公), seventh son
Concubine,  of the Susu Gioro clan (侧室 舒舒觉罗氏)
Empress Xiaozhaoren (孝昭仁皇后; 1653 – 18 March 1678), second daughter
Noble Consort Wenxi (溫僖貴妃;d.19 December 1694), third daughter
Faka (法喀 ;17 May 1664– 9 February 1713), First Class Duke (一等公), third son

Unknown
Princess Consort (王妃), of the Niohuru clan (鈕祜祿氏), first daughter
Married Zhashen (札什),  of the Mongol Barin clan (漠南蒙古巴林氏)
Sailin (塞林 三等侍卫),Third Class Imperial Guard, first son
Second son
Fifth Daughter
Married  Ayushen (阿玉什), First Class Viscount (一等子)
Yanzhu (颜珠 一等侍卫;b. 1665), First Class Imperial Guard, fourth son
Fubao (富保 任二等侍卫;b.1678),Second Class Imperial Guard, fifth son
Yinde, First Class Duke (尹德 一等公), sixth son

Notes

Bibliography

.
.

See also
Breaking the Chains
University of Southern California: Chinese History

1673 deaths
17th-century Chinese people
17th-century viceregal rulers
Manchu politicians
Manchu Bordered Yellow Bannermen
Qing dynasty regents
Year of birth unknown
Niohuru clan